Early parliamentary elections were held in Egypt on 27 October 1971, with a second round for 141 seats taking place on 3 November, following the adoption of a new constitution in September 1971. At the time the country was a one-party state and all candidates had to be members of the Arab Socialist Union (ASU). Two candidates were elected from each of the 175 constituencies (although the six constituencies in Sinai and Suez were not contested and their representatives appointed by the President), with a second round of voting required if one or both of the candidates failed to win over 50% of the vote in the first round, or neither of the candidates with over 50% were classed as a worker or farmer (each constituency had to have at least one farmer or worker representing it). In total, 1,661 candidates contested the elections.

Following the elections, a further 10 members were appointed by the President.

Results

References

Elections in Egypt
1971 in Egypt
Egypt
One-party elections
October 1971 events in Africa
Election and referendum articles with incomplete results